Nadja Michael (born 1969) is a German opera singer with an active international career singing leading soprano roles. Her mother's great-aunt was the soprano Erna Sack.

Early life and education 
She was born near Leipzig in Wurzen, then East Germany. Growing up, she enjoyed singing German folksongs with her family while her mother played the piano. Her grandmother and father both served time in prison for political reasons. Eventually, she escaped to West Germany where she studied music in Stuttgart. Later, she attended the Jacobs School of Music (Indiana University) in the United States.

Opera career 
She began her career as a mezzo-soprano but became a soprano in April 2005. Michael has appeared at La Scala (Salome, 2007), Royal Opera House, Covent Garden (Salome, 2008), Vienna State Opera (Fidelio), Arena di Verona, Glyndebourne, Salzburg, Munich (Macbeth and Medea in Corinto), Brussels (Médée, 2008), Chicago (Macbeth, 2010), Berlin (Wozzeck, under Daniel Barenboim, 2011), and San Francisco Opera (Salome, 2009 and The Makropulos Case, 2016).

In 2012, Michael made her Metropolitan Opera debut, as Lady Macbeth, opposite Thomas Hampson and Dimitri Pittas. In 2015 she returned to the company as Judith in Bluebeard's Castle of Béla Bartók.

Personal life 
She resides in Berlin and founded a charity, Stimme fur die Menschlichkeit (Voice for Humanity).

Videography 
 Bizet: Carmen (Teatro di San Carlo, Naples; Amsellem, Larin, G. Baker; Oren, Corsicato, 2001) [live] Planeta de Agostini
 Verdi: Don Carlos [as Princesse Eboli] (Vienna State Opera, Vienna; Tamar, Vargas, Skovhus, Miles; de Billy, Konwitschny, 2003) [live] TDK
 Puccini: Tosca (Bregenzer Festspiele; Todorovich, Saks; Schirmer, Breisach, 2007) [live] Naxos
 Strauss: Salome (La Scala; Vermillion, Bronder, Struckmann; Harding, Bondy, 2007) [live] TDK
 Strauss: Salome (Royal Opera House; T.Moser, Volle; P.Jordan, McVicar, 2008) [live] Opus Arte
 Mayr: Medea in Corinto (Bavarian State Opera; Vargas, Miles; Bolton, Neuenfels, 2010) [live] Arthaus
 Cherubini: Médée (La Monnaie, Brussels; van Kerckhove, Stotijn, Streit, Le Texier; Rousset, Warlikowski, 2011) Bel Air Classiques

References

External links 

 , Berlin State Opera in the Schiller Theater
 
 

German operatic sopranos
German operatic mezzo-sopranos
Jacobs School of Music alumni
1969 births
Living people
People from Wurzen
20th-century German   women opera singers
21st-century German   women opera singers